Faora is a supervillainess appearing in American comic books published by DC Comics, commonly in association with Superman. The character was created by Cary Bates and Curt Swan, and first appeared in Action Comics #471 (May 1977). Most commonly, Faora is an ally and sometimes the wife and/or lover of Superman's Kryptonian nemesis General Zod. 

Faora appears in the television series Smallville, portrayed by Erica Durance and Sharon Taylor. Faora appears in the DC Extended Universe films Man of Steel (2013) and the upcoming film The Flash (2023), portrayed by Antje Traue.

Publication history
Faora first appeared in Action Comics #471 (May 1977) and was created by Cary Bates and Curt Swan.

Fictional character biography

Pre-Crisis
The first Faora, Faora Hu-Ul, was introduced in Action Comics #471. She is a beautiful Kryptonian woman whose unexplained hatred for men led her to torture and kill 23 of them in the secret concentration camp.  For this, she was imprisoned in the Phantom Zone to complete a sentence of 300 Kryptonian years, the second longest term after Jax-Ur. Surviving her homeworld's destruction, along with the other Phantom Zone prisoners, she existed in an invisible ghost-like form. While in the Zone, she often depicted plotting against Superman with General Zod and Jax-Ur. The hatred of men was not limited to different races, as she demonstrates this pointless murder on a young Frenchman who was attracted by her beauty.

Faora is an expert at the Kryptonian martial of Horo-Kanu. This allows her to take advantage on the body's pressure points. This made her an extremely dangerous foe for Superman to face in close combat. When she beaten him, he was forced to flee from their first encounter. During one of her appearances, Faora could manifest some sort of "mental lightning" to physically attack Kryptonian survivors, but did not exhibit this additional power during later battles.

Post-Crisis

Pocket Universe
Following the Crisis on Infinite Earths, another Faora (renamed Zaora) appeared in the Pocket Universe created by the Time Trapper, along with General Zod and Quex-Ul. The three tricked the Pocket Universe's Lex Luthor into releasing them from the Phantom Zone. After the Pocket Earth's population continued to resist their conquest of it, the three villains destroyed the atmosphere, killing almost all life. Superman defeated them by permanently stripping the three of their super powers with gold Kryptonite. He then executed them with Kryptonite in punishment for their crimes, and to protect the real Earth after they threatened to somehow regain their powers and destroy it as well. Zaora pleaded with Superman for her life, offering him "all sorts of favors", before she succumbed to the Kryptonite.

Phantom Zone entity
In the Eradicator mini-series, Dr. David Conner was pressured into embracing his programming by another construct of Kem-L. This artifact, which was trapped in the Phantom Zone, claimed to be called Faora, after Kem-L's grandmother, and to be the ultimate repository of Kryptonian mythology. However, it is unclear how much of this is true.

The Eradicator rejects it, "downloading" all these aspects of ancient programming that contradicted his morality into Faora's artificial intelligence. Unknown to him, this gave it a new, monstrous form and dimensional-based powers. After leaving the Zone, it targeted Conner's family. The Eradicator destroyed Faora, but not before it kills his wife.

Pokolistanian
Another Faora was introduced as one of General Zod's aides in a fictional Pokolistan nation. This character, who debuted in Action Comics #779 (July 2001), is an orphan metahuman. Faora has molecular abilities to a limited degree. She created a mutagenic virus for Zod as part of the linchpin plan. Her whereabouts following the General's defeat are unknown.

"Return to Krypton"
In a 2001–2002 storyline, Superman and Lois Lane visit a version of Krypton which is later revealed to have been created by the villainous Brainiac 13 and based on Jor-El's favorite period in Kryptonian history.  In this Krypton, Lois and Clark become fugitives and are pursued by Faora and Kru-El, romantically linked manhunters known as "the Hounds of Zod." This version of Faora, calling herself "the Tigress of Zod", later returns as an ally of Jor-El.  She and Kru-El are both killed in a struggle against Kryptonian religious zealots.

New 52/DC Rebirth
Faora Hu-Ul returned during New 52 and following into DC Rebirth where they shared a loathing of Krypton's ideals of peace and science and desired a return to the old days, when Krypton was a brutal militaristic empire. In time, she met Dru-Zod, a colonel who shared the same dream. Zod gathered a group of like-minded supporters, but he became especially interested in Faora because of her blood lust. Faora became complicit in Zod's engineering of a false flag operation, which triggered a war with the alien Char. Jor-El, an old friend of Zod's, discovered the deception and turned Zod over to the authorities. This resulted in the sentencing of Zod and his followers, Faora among them, to the Phantom Zone but later sent Doomsday into the boundaries allowing an escape.  But the escape leaves Faora in the zone while Zod tricks Superman into releasing her using the Fortress of Solitude's technology. The duo would later face Superman again and Wonder Woman in the South Pacific.

Powers and abilities
As a Kryptonian, Faora has superpowers derived from under the light of Earth's yellow sun in that solar system. These basic abilities are sufficient for her to bend steel, overpower a locomotive, leap over a tall building in one bound, and outrun a speeding bullet; as well as virtual invulnerability, accelerated recovery, laser eyebeams, vortex breath, and flight. She possesses extraordinary senses of hearing and sight, including x-ray, telescopic, and microscopic vision. The Pre-Crisis version of Faora had gotten new powers. She can telepathically communicate or sometimes does it unconsciously and project bolts of psychic energy to weaken other Kryptonians from the Phantom Zone. While in the Zone, she is effectively immortal (and untouchable). Faora knows Horu-Kanu - the deadliest form of martial arts on Krypton. This technique utilizes precisely aimed pressure points to disable, cripple, or kill opponents. Both versions have expertise in unarmed combat. Even her power levels are more akin to Supergirl. Like all Kryptonians, she is also vulnerable to Kryptonite, red sunlight, and magic. 

The metahuman version of Faora has the ability to disrupt molecular bonds.

Other versions
In the DC Bombshells continuity, Faora resembling her Man of Steel counterpart led a coup on Krypton during its final days which consisted of herself, Lara Lor-Van, and Alura In-Ze, who weren't considered "clean" enough by Kryptonians for fertility. The three conceived a daughter that they believed would be the strongest of Krypton, as she had a balance of "clean" and "unclean" Kryptonian genes. When Lara and Alura discovered Faora was willing to kill to achieve her vision, they banished her to the Phantom Zone. Her pod is discovered and broken open by the Thanagarians, who provided her with a ship that could allow her to travel anywhere. She travels to Earth, where she waits decades for the baby's escape pod to crash into the planet. When the baby's pod would land in Russia and the girl would become adopted by the Starikov's and named Kara, Faora took samples of Kara's blood from the pod, which allowed her ally scientist Hugo Strange to create clones of Kara who would become known as Power Girl and Superman. She also allied herself with other villains who wanted to take over the world such as Paula von Gunther, the Joker's Daughter, and Killer Frost. She monitor's Kara's progress in the Soviet Army and as Supegirl under the disguise of General Khulun. She invites Supergirl to join her in conquering the world, but the girl refuses as she views Faora's methods as no better than the dying Krypton's. When Trigon's daughter Raven briefly transforms into an unstable demonic being after her father's death, Faora takes some of Raven's blood and injects herself with it, transforming into this dimension's version of Doomsday. The heroes stop her by trapping her inside of Swamp Thing and casting a spell that required the sacrifice of Kara's adoptive parents and Stargirl's father.

In other media

Television
 Faora appears in the Superman (1988) episode "The Hunter", voiced by Ginny McSwain. This version is an inmate of the Phantom Zone who collaborated with General Zod and Ursa to create the titular Hunter, a creature that can transmute itself into any substance that it touches.
 Faora makes a non-speaking cameo appearance in the Legion of Super Heroes episode "Phantoms" as an inmate of the Phantom Zone.
 Faora appears in Smallville, portrayed by Sharon Taylor. This version is a native of Kandor, loyal follower and wife of Major Zod, and co-creator of Doomsday who has a younger sister named Vala and was imprisoned in the Phantom Zone as a disembodied wraith. In the eighth season episode "Bloodline", Faora escapes, possesses Lois Lane (portrayed by Erica Durance), and battles Clark Kent until Kara Kent exorcises Faora from Lane's body. In the ninth season, Tess Mercer uses a Kryptonian device called the "Orb" to create clones of several Kandorians, such as a young Faora and Zod. After she and Vala are taken by Amanda Waller, Faora offers to join Checkmate, but is killed by Zod, who learns too late that she was pregnant with their baby.
 Additionally, an alternate timeline version of Faora who acquired Kryptonian superpowers appears in the episode "Pandora".
 Faora appears in The Looney Tunes Show episode "SuperRabbit", voiced by Sonya Walger.
 Faora appears in Justice League Action, voiced by Fryda Wolff.
 Faora Hu-Ul appears in Young Justice: Phantoms, voiced by Denise Boutte.

Film
 Faora purportedly served as inspiration for Superman (1978) and Superman IIs incarnation of Ursa despite being introduced in the comics while the films were in the midst of production.
 Faora appears in the DC Extended Universe (DCEU) film Man of Steel, portrayed by Antje Traue. Gal Gadot was originally offered the part, but declined due to being pregnant at the time. This version is General Zod's lieutenant who, along with the rest of their battalion, the Sword of Rao, was sentenced to the Phantom Zone. Following Krypton's destruction, the Sword of Rao escape and head to Earth to search for Kal-El and the Codex, a device containing the genetic code of all future Kryptonians, only to be defeated by Kal-El and sent back to the Phantom Zone.
 Traue will reprise her role as Faora in the DCEU film The Flash.

Video games
The Man of Steel incarnation of Faora appears as a playable character in Lego Batman 3: Beyond Gotham via DLC.

References
  Text was copied from Faora Hu-Ul (Prime Earth) at DC Database, which is released under a Creative Commons Attribution-Share Alike 3.0 (Unported) (CC-BY-SA 3.0) license.

Characters created by Cary Bates
Characters created by Curt Swan
Comics characters introduced in 1977
DC Comics characters who can move at superhuman speeds
DC Comics characters who have mental powers
DC Comics characters with accelerated healing
DC Comics characters with superhuman senses
DC Comics characters with superhuman strength 
DC Comics extraterrestrial supervillains
DC Comics female supervillains
DC Comics orphans
DC Comics telepaths
Fictional artificial intelligences
Fictional characters with absorption or parasitic abilities
Fictional characters with air or wind abilities
Fictional characters with energy-manipulation abilities
Fictional characters with fire or heat abilities
Fictional characters with ice or cold abilities
Fictional characters with nuclear or radiation abilities
Fictional characters with slowed ageing
Fictional characters with superhuman durability or invulnerability
Fictional characters with X-ray vision
Fictional mass murderers
Kryptonians
DC Comics metahumans
Superman characters